These are the Billboard magazine R&B singles chart number-one hits of 1991. There were 38 R&B singles for 1991. The longest running number-one single of 1991 was Shanice's "I Love Your Smile", which spent four weeks at the top position (two weeks in December 1991, and two more in January 1992).

Chart history

See also
1991 in music
List of number-one R&B albums of 1991 (U.S.)
List of Billboard Hot 100 number-one singles of 1991

References

1991
1991 record charts
1991 in American music